Charles Dillon was a British furniture designer. He and his wife, Jane Dillon ran an international design studio between 1971 and 1982 making significant contributions to furniture design and lighting design across America and Europe. Their studio archives are held at the Victoria and Albert Museum.

References 

 Lesley Jackson, "Modern British Furniture: Design Since 1945" V&A Museum Publishing, 2013
 Fiona MacCarthy (ed.), The Perfect Place to Grow: 175 Years of the Royal College of Art, Royal College of Art, 2012.
 Deyan Sudjic, Terence Conran: The Way We Live Now, Design Museum, 2011.
 Giorgio Maffei, Bruno Tonini and Ettore Sottsass, Books by Ettore Sottsass, Corraini Editore, 2011.
 Lesley Jackson, The Sixties: Decade of Design Revolution, Phaidon Press, 2000.
 Peter Childs and Michael Storry (eds.), Encyclopaedia of Contemporary British Culture, Routledge, 1999.

British designers
British furniture designers
Year of birth missing
1982 deaths